NGC 5398 is a barred spiral galaxy in the southern constellation of Centaurus. It was discovered June 3, 1836 by John Herschel.

The morphological class of NGC 5398 is SB(rs)dm, indicating this is a spiral galaxy with an inner bar (SB) and incomplete ring (rs) structures, plus broken, irregular spiral arms (dm). The galactic plane is inclined at an angle of 53° to the line of sight from the Earth.

At the southwestern end of the bar lies a giant H II region (GHR) designated Tol 89. This is the only large site in NGC 5398 that is undergoing star formation, and it suggests that NGC 5398 is engaged in some form of interaction.

See also
 NGC 4618 - a similar galaxy
 NGC 4625 - a similar galaxy

References

External links

 GALEX page on NGC 5398

Barred spiral galaxies
Centaurus (constellation)
5398
49923
UGCA objects